Herdman Collegiate, usually known simply as "Herdman", was a high school in Corner Brook, Newfoundland, Canada.

History
When the school opened in the mid-1950s, it was known as Amalgamated Regional High School. It was in the mid-1960s when it became known as Herdman Collegiate. The school continued operations until 2005 when it went into complete reconstruction as part of the city's new "Super School", Corner Brook Regional High School.

Sports and clubs
Herdman housed a vast number of sports, clubs and societies. Sports such as basketball, hockey, volleyball, wrestling, and softball were available for students. Clubs, like the newspaper, SADD, Allied Youth, Student council, drama club and Amnesty International were among some of the more popular ones which many students chose to take part in.

References

High schools in Newfoundland and Labrador
Corner Brook
Educational institutions in Canada with year of establishment missing